The Type A engine was a straight-six engine produced from 1935 through 1947 by Toyota.

The Type B was a technically more advanced version of the Type A. There was an enlarged version of this, called the Type D, but it did not enter production.

The Type C was a straight-four engine derived from the Type A.

Many parts were interchangeable between the Type A, Type B and Type C engines (e.g. pistons, valves, rods).  Many of the same parts were also interchangeable with the Chevrolet Stovebolt engine, from which it was derived.

The Type E was a copy of a DKW engine.

The Type S was a straight-four engine that replaced the Type A, B and C in Toyota's passenger cars.

Type A

The Type A engine was Toyota's first production engine, being produced from 1935 through 1947.

This engine was a  pushrod, overhead valve, 6-cylinder, three bearing engine copied from the 1929–36 Chevrolet Gen-1 3 bearing Stovebolt L6 OHV engine. By virtue of a modified intake manifold it produced , while the Chevrolet engine produced . GM used a number of local Japanese suppliers for the smaller engine parts (e.g. carburettors) while the Osaka Assembly location was open until appropriated by the Imperial Japanese Government. Toyota was able to use the same suppliers for its cars.  The parts were identical enough that pistons, rods, valves, etc. could be used in both the Chevrolet and Toyota engines interchangeably. There are several recorded instances of parts intended for one being used to repair the other.

Toyota had initially considered copying the Ford flathead V8 engine because it was the most popular engine in Japan at the time. However, the machining of two separate banks of cylinders would add too much to the production cost, so the Chevrolet engine was copied instead. The Ford Model T was also being manufactured in Japan beginning in March 1925, followed by the Ford Model A in 1927; both used the flathead Ford Model T engine.

Other references to the Chevy engine claim different power figures. Different manufactures used different measuring techniques (e.g. with or without the generator/alternator connected), engines differed from year to year and that some manufacturers simply lied.  In this case, Toyota did back to back comparisons using the same techniques, so it is likely that the Toyota engine did in fact produce slightly more power than the Chevy engine on which it was based. Also, the Chevy engine was likely to be a year or two old, so the current Chevy engine may have produced even more power.

Applications
 A1 prototype car
 AA sedan
 AB cabriolet
 G1 truck
 GA truck

Type B

The  Type B was a more technically advanced version of the Type A. Production commenced in November 1938 with the opening of Toyota's Koromo plant. The design was based on the Chevrolet 207 engine, and built under license but with metric dimensions and minor revisions to suit the local market. It had a four-bearing crank and shaft-mounted rocker arms, as did the Chevrolet engine. The type B engine remained in production until 1956 at least.

Another bump, to  occurred at the time of the BM truck's introduction in March 1947. A 1944 prototype for a large passenger car called "Toyota Large B" also received the B-series engine, although with a higher 6.9:1 compression ratio and producing . This was also the output of the improved engine fitted to the 4-ton BA and 2.5-ton BC trucks which were built until February and July 1956 respectively.

The Type B was complemented and eventually supplanted by the similar 3.9 L Type F which first appeared in 1951. The Type F is based on the larger OHV GMC Straight-6 engine built from 1939 until 1963 in the same way that the Type A and Type B were based on the Chevrolet engines of their times. There was also an experimental 4-liter version called the Type D.

An unrelated four-cylinder diesel engine introduced in the 1970s was also called the Type B.

Applications
 Toyota AC sedan
 1938-1942 Toyota GB truck
 1940-1941 Toyota HB truck, a shortened GB
 1942-1944 Toyota KB truck
 1943-1947 Toyota KC/KCY truck
 1947-1951 Toyota BM truck, also shorter wheelbase BS model from 1949
 1949- Toyota BL bus
 1951-1955 BX/BZ truck (82 PS)
 1951-1955 BJ Jeep (predecessor to the Land Cruiser)
 1952- Toyota BQ 3/4-ton 4WD truck, reserved for security and police forces
 Toyota BH26 Police Patrol Car (using a modified Toyopet Crown RS body)
 Toyota BH28 Ambulance
 1954-1956 BA/BC truck (85 PS, improved BX type)

Type C

The  Type C was produced from 1939 through 1941.  It was formed by removing two cylinders from a Type A engine.

Applications
 AE sedan
 AK 4WD

Type D

The  Type D was a larger version of the B engine developed in early 1944, featuring an increased bore while retaining the same stroke. It was a direct response to a national order issued in 1940, instructing Toyota to develop a higher output engine based on the B. It did not enter series production, with Toyota instead developing the somewhat smaller Type F engine after the war.

Type E

The  Type E was produced in 1938 only for the prototype EA sedan.  It was a copy of the two-stroke engine used in the DKW F7.

Applications
 EA FWD sedan (a copy of the DKW F7)
 EB RWD sedan

Type S

The  Type S was produced from 1947 through 1959.  It was unrelated to previous Toyota overhead valve engines, being designed by reverse-engineering a 1930s Adler Trumpf Junior's engine, and used the less sophisticated flathead engine design which was short lived.

Applications
 SA sedan
 SB light truck
 SC sedan
 SD sedan
 SF sedan
 SG light truck
 Toyopet SH Custom sedan
 Toyopet Light Truck SKB/SK20 Toyoace
 ST10 Corona, ST16 Corona Van

See also

 List of Toyota engines
 Toyota AA passenger car
 Toyota G1 truck

References

A
Straight-six engines
ja:トヨタ・A型エンジン (初代)
ja:トヨタ・B型エンジン (初代)
ja:トヨタ・C型エンジン (初代)